Sir William McLintock, 1st Baronet, GBE, CVO (26 September 1873 – 8 May 1947) was a British accountant. He was a senior partner in the firm of Thomson McLintock & Company, chartered accountants.

See also 

 McLintock baronets

References 

 https://www.oxforddnb.com/view/10.1093/ref:odnb/9780198614128.001.0001/odnb-9780198614128-e-34790

1873 births
1947 deaths
British accountants
Baronets in the Baronetage of the United Kingdom
Knights Grand Cross of the Order of the British Empire
Commanders of the Royal Victorian Order
Businesspeople from Glasgow
19th-century Scottish businesspeople
20th-century Scottish businesspeople